Les Abrets is a former commune in the Isère department in the Auvergne-Rhône-Alpes region of southeastern France. On 1 January 2016, it was merged into the new commune of Les Abrets-en-Dauphiné, of which it became a delegated commune.

The inhabitants of the commune are known as Abrésiens or Abrésiennes

Geography
Les Abrets is located some 30 km west of Chambery and 25 km east of Bourgoin-Jallieu. The commune can be accessed on the D1075 road from the north-west continuing through the commune and the village to La Bâtie-Divisin in the south. The D1006 highway comes from La Tour-du-Pin in the west and intersects the D1075 in the centre of the village then continues to Le Pont-de-Beauvoisin in the east. There is also the D142E road from the village going north-east, the D592 which goes north from the village continuing to Chimilin, and the D142 going north-west to Fitilieu. A railway passes through the commune from west to east with a station just outside the western edge of the commune. The urban area of Les Abrets covers a large portion of the commune with a belt of forest running north to south through the centre of the commune. With some forested areas in the east of the commune  and some forest in the east, the balance of the land area is farmland.

The Bievre stream flows south down the eastern edge of the commune. Other streams flow near the village and to the south.

Neighbouring communes and villages

Toponymy
The term Abrets comes from Albrez Albretum or Arbreta (from the Latin Arbor: relative to a tree). This wooded area was given to the "Poor Knights of Christ" in about 1124 who then became the Knights of the Temple of Jerusalem in 1128, known under the name of the Templars.

Heraldry

Administration
List of Successive Mayors of Les Abrets

Mayors from 1935

Population
In 2012 the commune had 3,607 inhabitants.

Sites and Monuments
A Church (19th century) contains a Chalice with Paten (17th century) which is registered as an historical object.
The Domaine des Fauves (Abrets Zoological Park)
Path of Pilgrimage to Saint-Jacques de Compostela: Les Abrets is located on one of the pilgrims trails
The Bourgeat Factory makes catering equipment and stainless steel for professional kitchens
The Centre Jean Jannin is an establishment for people with disabilities founded in 1977

The Zoo Picture Gallery

Notable People linked to the commune
Thomas Joseph-Armand Caillat, religious goldsmith, lived in the commune.

See also
Communes of the Isère department

References

External links
Les Abrets official website 
Les Abrets on Géoportail, National Geographic Institute (IGN) website 
Les Abrets on the 1750 Cassini Map

Former communes of Isère